Insaf Qal'aji (born 1946) is a Jordanian short story writer of Syrian descent.

Born in Haifa, Qal'aji graduated from the University of Jordan, at which she had studied Arabic, in 1969; she later received a master's degree from the School of Oriental and African Studies at the University of London. Her first collection of short stories, Sorrow Has Remnants of Joy, appeared in 1987. Her work has been anthologized in English. She was at one time married to the academic Khaled al-Karaki.

References

1946 births
Living people
Jordanian short story writers
Jordanian women writers
Women short story writers
20th-century short story writers
20th-century women writers
21st-century short story writers
21st-century women writers
Jordanian people of Syrian descent
People from Haifa
University of Jordan alumni
Alumni of SOAS University of London